Slim Smith (born Keith Smith; 1948 in Kingston, Jamaica – 1972) was a ska, rocksteady and reggae singer. In their book Reggae: The Rough Guide (1997), Steve Barrow and Peter Dalton described Smith as "the greatest vocalist to emerge in the rocksteady era".

Biography
Smith first came to prominence as a member of the Victors Youth Band, who were highly praised at the 1964 Jamaican Festival. He subsequently became a founding member and lead vocalist of The Techniques, who recorded primarily with Duke Reid for his Treasure Isle label. In 1964 they recorded several songs for Byron Lee, two of which, "Don't Do It" and "No One", were included on the LP The Real Jamaica Ska released by Epic Records and co-produced by Curtis Mayfield. After the Techniques disbanded in 1965, he formed The Uniques, who released a handful of singles including the R&B influenced "Do Me Good" released on Ken Lack's Caltone records in 1966.

In 1966 Slim Smith commenced recording for Prince Buster and Coxsone Dodd's Studio One label, the main rival to Duke Reid. His Studio One recordings brilliantly highlight his passionate, soulful voice, which had an almost manic edge, and confirm him as one of Jamaica's greatest singers. His hits from this period include "The New Boss", "Hip Hug" and "Rougher Yet", many of which were later compiled for the album Born To Love. In 1967 he formed a new version of The Uniques, and commenced his association with producer Bunny Lee. They topped the Jamaican hit parade with "Let Me Go Girl", but after recording one album, Absolutely The Uniques, Smith left the group, staying with Lee to concentrate on a solo career.

He had a hit almost immediately with "Everybody Needs Love". An album of the same name quickly followed, as did many further hits. By 1972 personal problems led to him being detained at Bellevue sanatorium.

Smith died on the night of October 9, 1972. Unable to gain entry to his parents' house, he broke a window, badly lacerating his arm. He bled to death before he could receive treatment. His death stunned Jamaica. Still widely regarded as one of Jamaica's great vocalists, his enduring popularity has resulted in the reissue of the bulk of his work.

Album discography
Everybody Needs Love (1969, Pama)
Just a Dream (1972, Pama/Trojan)
Memorial (1973, Trojan)
Dancehall Connection (1986, Third World)
Born To Love (198?, Studio One)
Early Days (19??, Striker Lee)
Rain From The Skies (1992, Trojan)

There have also been numerous 'best of' compilations released.

See also
The Techniques
The Uniques

References

External links
Slim Smith at Roots Archives 

20th-century Jamaican male singers
1948 births
1973 deaths
Musicians from Kingston, Jamaica
Jamaican reggae singers
Trojan Records artists
Deaths from bleeding
The Uniques (Jamaican group) members